This is a list of recording artists who have reached number one on Billboard magazine's  Adult Top 40 chart.

0-9
 3 Doors Down (2)
 5 Seconds of Summer(1) 
 24kGoldn (1)

A
 Adele (6)
 Christina Aguilera (2)
 AJR (1)
 The All-American Rejects (1)
 American Authors (1)
 James Arthur (1)
 Avicii (1)

B
 Tal Bachman (1)
 Alex Band (2)
 Sara Bareilles (1)
 Gabby Barrett (1)
 Em Beihold (1)
 Justin Bieber (5)
 Benny Blanco (1)
 James Blunt (1)
 Boyz II Men (1)
 Michelle Branch (1)

C

D
 Da Baby (1)
 Daughtry (4)
 Gavin DeGraw (1)
 Dazy (1)
 Del Amitri (1)
 Jason Derulo (1)
 Dido (1)
 Celine Dion (1)
 Iann Dior (1)
 Diplo (1)
 DNCE (1)

E
 Enya (1)
 Evanescence (1)

F
 Fergie (1)
 Five for Fighting (1)
 Florida Georgia Line (1)
 The Fray (2)
 Fun (2)

G
 Gayle (1)
 Glass Animals (1)
 Gnarls Barkley (1)
 Gnash (1)
 Goo Goo Dolls (3)
 Gotye (1)
 Grey (1)
 Ellie Goulding (3)
 Andy Grammer (1)
 A Great Big World (1)
 Green Day (2)
 David Guetta (1)

H
 Halsey (3)
 Sophie B. Hawkins (1)
 Faith Hill (1)
 Hoobastank (1)
 Hootie & the Blowfish (1)
 Niall Horan (1)
 Hot Chelle Rae (1)
 Hozier(1)

I
 Imagine Dragons (4)
 Natalie Imbruglia (1)

J
 Jawsh 685 (1)
 Jewel (2)
 JID (1)
 Elton John (2)
 Jonas Brothers (1)

K
 Khalid (1)
 The Kid Laroi (2)
 Kimbra (1)
 Elle King (1)
 Kings of Leon (1)
 Chad Kroeger (1)

L

M

N
 Neon Trees (1)
 Nickelback (5)
 Nico & Vinz (1)
 Normani (1)
 No Doubt (1)

O
 One Direction (1)
 OneRepublic (4)
 Owl City (1)

P
 Panic! at the Disco (1)
 Sean Paul (1)
 Paramore (1)
 Passenger (1)
 Katy Perry (8)
 Kim Petras (1)
 Phillip Phillips (1)
 Pink (10)
 Plain White T's (1)
 Rachel Platten (2)
 Portugal. The Man (1)
 Daniel Powter (1)
 Charlie Puth (3)

R
 Bebe Rexha (2)
 Olivia Rodrigo (2)
 Mark Ronson (1)
 Nate Ruess (1)

S

T
 Robin Thicke (1)
 Rob Thomas (4)
 T.I. (1)
 Timbaland (1)
 Justin Timberlake (3)
 Train (4)
 Meghan Trainor (2)
 KT Tunstall (1)
 Twenty One Pilots (1)

U
 Uncle Kracker (1)

V
 Vertical Horizon (1)

W
 Walk the Moon (1)
 The Wallflowers (1)
 The Weeknd (2)
 Pharrell Williams (2)

X
 X Ambassadors (1)

Y
 Young Thug (1)
 Nicky Youre (1)

Z

Zedd (1)

References

Adult Top 40